Edward Jefferys (7 February 1936 – 27 September 1998) was a South African sprinter. He competed in the men's 100 metres, men's 200 metres and men's 4 x 400 metres relay at the 1960 Summer Olympics. Jeffery finished sixth in the 220 yards and was eliminated in the semi-finals of the 100 yards at the 1958 British Empire and Commonwealth Games.

References

1936 births
1998 deaths
Athletes (track and field) at the 1960 Summer Olympics
South African male sprinters
Olympic athletes of South Africa
Athletes (track and field) at the 1958 British Empire and Commonwealth Games
Commonwealth Games competitors for South Africa
Sportspeople from Durban